Giovanna Ewbank Baldacconi Gagliasso (born 14 September 1986) is a Brazilian actress, model, and television presenter.

Career
She began acting in theater at the age of twelve. Next, she started modeling and later joined the university of Fashion. She studied theater, film and TV acting, when she got cast for the TV series Workout as the hick “Marcinha”. At that time, among some of her works were the catalog of Bumbum designer, beachwear, in November 2007, and the cover of Vizoo magazine, April 2008, besides having printed the cover of Corpo a Corpo in the same period.

In 2008, she debuted In the soap opera  A Favorita, by Rede Globo, where she played Sharon, a call girl.

In 2015, she joined the team of the Video Show as a reporter and occasional presenter, luckily for her,  in July 2016, she decided to leave Globo because they never actually offered her a permanent contract.

Currently, she has a YouTube channel with over four million subscribers.

Personal life
Giovanna was born in São Paulo, Brazil. Her mother Deborah Ewbank is of Scottish descent and her father Roberto Baldacconi has Italian roots.

She has been in a relationship with Brazilian actor Bruno Gagliasso since 2008. They married in 2010 and in July 2016 adopted a two-year-old African girl from Malawi, called Chissomo, whom they nicknamed Titi. In July 2019, the couple adopted a four-year-old boy named Bless, again from Malawi.

In December 2019 she announced she was pregnant.

In September 2022, Giovanna declared being demisexual in her videocast "Quem pode, pod".

Filmography

Television

TV presenter

Reality shows

Film

Theater

References

External links
 
 

1986 births
Living people
Actresses from São Paulo
Brazilian people of Scottish descent
Brazilian people of Italian descent
Brazilian television actresses
Brazilian female models
Brazilian film actresses
Brazilian YouTubers
21st-century Brazilian actresses

Asexual women
Demisexual people